Nayagaon was a village and now a Nagar Panchayat in Jawad Tehsil, Neemuch district, Madhya Pradesh, India.

References

Neemuch district